Battle of Manila may refer to:

Land battles 
 Battle of Manila (1570), Spanish forces from Mexico vs. Muslims from Brunei
 Battle of Manila (1574), Chinese Pirate Warlord "Limahong" vs. the Spanish
 Battle of Manila (1762), British take Manila during the Seven Years' War
 Raid on Manila (1798), British reconnaissance operation during French Revolutionary Wars
 Battle of Manila (1896), Filipino Revolutionaries vs. the Spanish during the Philippine Revolution
 Battle of Manila (1898), United States and Filipino Revolutionaries vs. the Spanish during the Spanish–American War
 Battle of Manila (1899), Filipino forces vs. the United States during the Philippine–American War
 Battle of Manila (1945), Liberation of Manila from Japan during World War II

Naval battles 
 Battles of La Naval de Manila (1646)
 Battle of Manila Bay (1898)

See also 
 Battle of Bangkusay Channel (1571)
 Battles of La Naval de Manila (1646)
 Battle of the Philippines (disambiguation)
 Philippine revolts against Spain